Juan-Miguel Villar Mir, 1st Marquess of Villar Mir (born 30 September 1931) is a Spanish billionaire, former politician, and the chairman and CEO of the construction company Obrascón Huarte Lain.

Early life
He was born in Madrid on 30 September 1931. He has a degree in Industrial Organisation, and a doctorate in Civil Engineering.

Career
From December 1975 to July 1976, he was the Minister of Economy and Finance. In 1976, he was Third Deputy Prime Minister of Spain for about six months, as a member of the Falange Española Tradicionalista y de las Juntas de Ofensiva Nacional Sindicalista party, under Prime Minister Carlos Arias Navarro.

Obrascón Huarte Lain fell into financial difficulties in the late 1980s, however, and was bought from bankruptcy for one penny in 1987 by Villar Mir, who remains the company's chairman today. Villar Mir turned around the firm's fortunes, and it listed on the Bolsa de Madrid in 1991.

He has been a non-executive director of Santander since 2013.

Personal life
He is married with three children and lives in Madrid, Spain.

References

1931 births
20th-century Spanish politicians
Deputy Prime Ministers of Spain
Economy and finance ministers of Spain
Living people
People from Madrid
People's Alliance (Spain) politicians
Spanish billionaires
20th-century Spanish businesspeople
21st-century Spanish businesspeople